The Camerata de' Bardi is the academic orchestra of the University of Pavia in Italy. It was founded in 1989 by Luca Bardi (violinist) and Franco Gerevini (pianist, oboist, and conductor). Its present conductor is Nicola Bisson.

References

External links
 Camerata de' Bardi

Musical groups established in 1989
Italian orchestras
University of Pavia